Karate at the Islamic Solidarity Games has been contested at every edition of the event. In 2005, men's events were contested and starting in 2013, both men's and women's events were contested. The sport was also contested at the 2022 Islamic Solidarity Games in Konya, Turkey.

Editions

Medal table
Updated until 2021 Islamic Solidarity Games

References

 
Islamic Solidarity Games